Liliana Graves (born 21 June 2002) is a Puerto Rican footballer who plays as a defender for Weston FC and the Puerto Rico women's national team.

References

2002 births
Living people
Women's association football defenders
Puerto Rican women's footballers
Puerto Rico women's international footballers